Ariadaeus may refer to:
 Philip III of Macedon (359 BC – 317 BC), king of Macedonia
Rima Ariadaeus, a linear rille on the Moon
Ariadaeus (crater), a crater on the Moon